Noted: Alicia Keys The Untold Stories  is a 2021 documentary series about the life and career of American singer and songwriter  Alicia Keys. The series offers insight into Keys’ world as a as an artist, a mother and wife through live performances, behind the scenes footage and conversations. The series was released in four episodes on YouTube as part of YouTube Originals September 30, 2021. In the series. Keys previews four songs, “Skydive”, “Is It Insane”, “Best of Me” and “Lala” from her eighth studio album Keys (2021). Fifth bonus episode was released on YouTube Premium and features behind the scenes footage of Keys and the director TT The Artist producing four music videos.

Overview
In episode 1, Keys is announced as the number one certified female R&B artist of the millennium, and interviews her mother about her childhood in New York City. In episode 2, Keys discusses her difficult career beginnings and relationship with Kerry Brothers Jr., and talks to her father about their relationship. In episode 3, Keys and Swizz Beatz discuss their family life and what makes their marriage work. In episode 4, Keys travels to The Bahamas to work on music and discusses equality in the music industry and collaborating with other artists.

Cast 

 Alicia Keys
 Swizz Beatz, husband
 Egypt and Genesis, sons
 Terria Joseph, mother
 Craig Cook, father
 Ann Mincieli, engineer and friend

Additionally, the behind-the-scenes footage used in the documentary feature Kerry Brothers Jr., Swae Lee, Raphael Saadiq and J. Cole, Jody Gerson among others.

Background 
The series was announced in May 2020, with Variety reporting that the working title of the project was Noted and that it would “follow the singer-songwriter as she celebrate[s] the 20th anniversary of her seminal album Songs in A Minor and heads into the studio to record her eighth record”, and was originally slated to premiere in the summer 2021.
 
In September 2021, Keys released the trailer for the series. In the trailer, Keys says that "When I'm making music, I'm exposing all of my secrets, and I'm very uncomfortable being exposed — but I guess not so much anymore". According to People, "viewers get a behind-the-scenes look at Keys' struggles in the midst of stardom". According to Entertainment Weekly, the docuseries "will show Keys as she takes viewers inside her world as an artist, a mother and wife". The director of the series, TT The Artist, commented that she “wanted to create an audiovisual experience that would definitely let the viewers connect with Alicia on a more personal level, like we’re in the studio with her, seeing her process, things that we don’t always get access to".

Episodes

Promotion 
Keys appeared on the Elvis Duran and the Morning Show to talk about the series on October 6, 2021. Keys discussed the series with Kay Adams on People (the TV show!) on October 7, 2021. Keys appeared on On Air with Ryan Seacrest on October 8, 2021. Keys held a YouTube live stream with Jay Shetty on October 7, 2021. In addition, Keys gave interviews to Essence, USA Today and Las Vegas Review-Journal.

References 

Documentary web series
2021 web series debuts
American non-fiction web series